Plopu is a commune in Prahova County, Muntenia, Romania. It is composed of four villages: Gâlmeia, Hârsa, Nisipoasa and Plopu.

References

Communes in Prahova County
Localities in Muntenia